Albert Fawcett Polk (October 11, 1869 – February 14, 1955) was an American lawyer and politician from Georgetown, in Sussex County, Delaware and later, Wilmington, Delaware. He was a member of the Democratic Party, who served as U.S. Representative from Delaware.

Early life and family
Polk was born in Federica, Delaware. He attended Delaware College, now the University of Delaware, in Newark, Delaware, graduating in 1889. Afterwards, he studied the law, was admitted to the Delaware Bar in 1892, and began a practice in Georgetown, Delaware.

Professional career
In 1899 Polk became an attorney for the Delaware State Senate and in 1902 become the chairman of the Sussex County Democratic Committee. He held this position until 1908 and again in 1915/16. At the same time, he was a member of the Democratic State Committee. He became a member of the Georgetown Board of Education in 1905 and served there until 1912. From 1914 until 1921 he was a member and secretary of the Board of Law Examiners of the Sussex County.

Polk was elected to the U.S. House of Representatives in 1916, defeating incumbent Republican U.S. Representative Thomas W. Miller. During this term, he served with the Democratic majority in the 65th Congress. Seeking reelection in 1918, he lost to Republican Caleb R. Layton, a physician from Georgetown. Polk served from March 4, 1917, until March 3, 1919, during the administration of U.S. President Woodrow Wilson.

Polk resumed the practice of law, moving his practice in 1921 to Wilmington, Delaware. He was appointed United States Commissioner for the District of Delaware in 1929 and held the position until his retirement in 1951.

Death and legacy
Polk died at Wilmington, Delaware. He is buried in the Union Cemetery, located at South Race Street, Georgetown. Take Route 113 south to Route 9 east into Georgetown. Follow Route 9 through the roundabout in center of town, then go right on South Race Street. Union Cemetery is at dead end.

Almanac
Elections are held the first Tuesday after November 1. U.S. Representatives took office March 4 and have a two-year term.

References

Images
Biographical Dictionary of the U.S. Congress

External links
Biographical Dictionary of the U.S. Congress
Delaware's Members of Congress
The Political Graveyard

Places with more information
Delaware Historical Society; website; 505 North Market Street, Wilmington, Delaware 19801; (302) 655-7161
University of Delaware; Library website; 181 South College Avenue, Newark, Delaware 19717; (302) 831-2965
Hagley Museum and Library website; Barley Mill Road, Wilmington, Delaware; (302) 658-2400
Newark Free Library; 750 Library Ave., Newark, Delaware; (302) 731-7550

1869 births
1955 deaths
People from Georgetown, Delaware
People from Wilmington, Delaware
University of Delaware alumni
Delaware lawyers
Burials in Sussex County, Delaware
Democratic Party members of the United States House of Representatives from Delaware